Adelchi Bianchi (1918 - 1968) was an Italian director, screenwriter, producer and cinematographer.

Life and career 
Born in  Rome,  Bianchi worked as a cinematographer on several short films in the 1940s and 1950s, often directed by Edmondo Cancellieri. Between 1951 and 1968 he produced, directed and partly wrote four films, dying shortly after ending the shooting of his last film.

Filmography 
 Beauties in Capri (1951)
 Past Lovers (1953)
 Vite perdute (1953)
 Buckaroo: The Winchester Does Not Forgive (1968)

References

External links 
 

1918 births
1968 deaths
Italian film directors
20th-century Italian screenwriters
Italian cinematographers
Italian film producers
Film people from Rome
Italian male screenwriters
20th-century Italian male writers